María Eulalia Armengol Argemi (born 29 June 1945), also known by her pseudonym Lali Armengol, is a Spanish playwright, professor of Spanish and literature, cultural manager and theater director. She has been the founder of Teatro 8 de Marzo and the Casa de la Mujer Juana Ramírez "La Avanzadora" theater groups, and has directed the Maracay University Theater.

Works 

 Betty Blue con remolacha
 Con un poco de...
 Las mañanas
 Las marcas del agua
 Miss Gloria
 Ojos sembrados
 Platos
 Puntos suspensivos... etc., etc.
 ¿Quién se comió el cuento?
 Un día como hoy

References

External links 
 El regreso del caracol, Letralia
 Lali Armengol: "Ser Miss Universo en Venezuela significa dólares y un buen matrimonio", La Vanguardia, 20 November 2013

1945 births
Living people
Spanish emigrants to Venezuela
Spanish women
Spanish women dramatists and playwrights
Venezuelan women educators
Venezuelan dramatists and playwrights